Ullerwood Castle is an early medieval castle, possibly a shell keep, in Ringway, Manchester, England. The castle is first referred to in 1173, in a document stating Hamo de Masci held the castles of Ullerwood and Dunham. There is no other contemporary documented reference to the castle. Ullerwood Castle has been confused with Watch Hill Castle in nearby Bowdon, but the two are separate castles, though both probably owned by de Masci. The site is underneath a house and surrounded by trees.

See also
Castles in Greater Manchester

References

Bibliography

Buildings and structures in Trafford
Castles in Greater Manchester